Shahid Bokharaei Metro Station is a station in Tehran Metro Line 1 and was formerly named Khazane Metro Station until 2016. It is between Ali Abad Metro Station and Payane Jonoob Metro Station.

Tehran Metro stations